Aïn Boucif District is a district of Médéa Province, Algeria.

The district is further divided into 5 municipalities:
Aïn Boucif
Kef Lakhdar
Ouled Maaref
Sidi Damed
El Ouinet

Districts of Médéa Province